
Gmina Mielnik is a rural gmina (administrative district) in Siemiatycze County, Podlaskie Voivodeship, in north-eastern Poland, on the border with Belarus.

Villages
Gmina Mielnik contains the villages and settlements of Adamowo-Zastawa, Grabowiec, Homoty, Końskie Góry, Koterka, Kudlicze, Maćkowicze, Mętna, Mielnik, Moszczona Królewska, Niemirów, Oksiutycze, Osłowo, Pawłowicze, Poręby, Radziwiłłówka, Sutno, Tokary, Wajków and Wilanowo.

Neighbouring gminas
Gmina Mielnik is bordered by the gminas of Konstantynów, Nurzec-Stacja, Sarnaki and Siemiatycze. It also borders Belarus.

References
Polish official population figures 2006

Mielnik
Siemiatycze County